Cottus koshewnikowi, Koshewnikow's sculpin, is a species of freshwater ray-finned fish belonging to the family Cottidae, the typical sculpins. It inhabits the upper Volga drainage and northern and eastern Gulf of Bothnia from Estonia eastward and northward to Finland and northern Sweden. It reaches a maximum length of 10.0 cm. It prefers medium-sized rivers to small streams, and lake shores.

References

Cottus (fish)
Fish described in 1907